is a Japanese manga artist. He was an assistant of Yoshio Sawai, the manga artist of Bobobo-bo Bo-bobo. Three of his manga Neuro: Supernatural Detective, Assassination Classroom, and The Elusive Samurai were serialized in Weekly Shōnen Jump. Neuro was adapted into an anime television series, as well as Assassination Classroom which was also adapted into two live action films.
His favorite manga series include Bobobo-bo Bo-bobo, JoJo's Bizarre Adventure and Kinnikuman. In episode 25 of the Neuro anime, he has a cameo voice as a manga artist.

Works

References

External links
 

1979 births
Living people
People from Iruma, Saitama
Manga artists from Saitama Prefecture